Ken Girotti is a Canadian television director who was nominated for a 2006 Gemini Award in the category "Best Direction in a Dramatic Series" for the TV series ReGenesis.

Career
He directed episode 9 of the first season of Supernatural. He directed episodes 3 and 4 of the second season of Vikings in 2014.

He was a producer on the series Anne with an E. For Pure he was a season second two director and also served as a second season executive director in 2018. He directed an episode of the drug trafficking drama Pure in 2019. He was a director and consulting producer for Fortunate Son.

As director
Girotti has directed one, two or more episodes of:
 Vikings
 Killjoys
 Being Erica
 Haven
 Supernatural
 Law & Order: Criminal Intent
 Rescue Me
 Stargate SG-1
 Soul Food
 The Outer Limits
 First Wave
 La Femme Nikita
 Psi Factor: Chronicles of the Paranormal
 Orphan Black
 Marvel's Daredevil
Saving Hope
The Crossing
Nurses 
Fortunate Son 
FBI: Most Wanted
Law & Order: Organized Crime

References

External links

Canadian television directors
Living people
Year of birth missing (living people)